Ochsenheimeria is a genus of moths of the family Ypsolophidae and only genus in the subfamily Ochsenheimeriinae.

Species
Ochsenheimeria algeriella Zagulajev, 1966
Ochsenheimeria bubalella (Hübner, 1813)
Ochsenheimeria capella Möschler, 1860
Ochsenheimeria glabratella Müller-Rutz, 1914
Ochsenheimeria hugginsi Bradley, 1953
Ochsenheimeria kisilkuma Zagulajev, 1966
Ochsenheimeria lovyi Dumont, 1930
Ochsenheimeria taurella (Denis & Schiffermüller, 1775)
Ochsenheimeria urella Fischer von Röslerstamm, 1842
Ochsenheimeria vacculella Fischer von Röslerstamm, 1842

Status unknown
Ochsenheimeria distinctella Zagulajev, 1972 (described from the Russian Far East)

References

Sources
 , 1975: Review of Ochsenheimeriidae and the introduction of the Ceral Stem Moth Ochsenheimeria vacculella into the United States (Lepidoptera: Tineoidea). Smithsonian Contributions to Zoology 192: 1-20. 

Ypsolophidae
Moth genera